Matthew J. Wilson is an American academic, serving as the dean of Temple University, Japan Campus. He was the fifth president of Missouri Western State University from July 2020 to August 2021. Prior to being at Missouri Western, Wilson served as president of the University of Akron from 2016 to 2018, serving as dean of its law school before that.

Wilson earned a bachelor's degree in Asian studies and political science with a minor in Japanese from the University of Utah. He earned his J.D. degree from Temple University.

Prior to his start in academia, Wilson practiced law in Florida. He also for a time practiced law in New Jersey.

In the late-2000s Wilson served as senior associate dean and general counsel for Temple University's Japan campus located in Tokyo. Among other positions at this location, Wilson was head of the law program there, which nearly quadrupled in size under his leadership.

From 2009 to 2014 Wilson was a professor of law at the University of Wyoming. He also served as associate dean of student affairs and associate dean of academic affairs in the law school there. While in this position he was over enrollment and saw it increase by 20%.

From 2014 to 2016 Wilson served as dean of the University of Akron college of law. During his leadership enrollment increased and for the first time the law school was given a tier-one ranking.

As president of the University of Akron Wilson finished the financial turnaround of his predecessor Scott Scarborough but managed to do it in a way that did not alienate significantly either the university community or the larger community of North-east Ohio. Wilson also began the process to bring back baseball as an inter-collegiate sport at the University of Akron, which was one of the least popular cost saving measures of Scarborough. Under Wilson the University of Akron also added a varsity esports program.

Wilson was named the fifth president of Missouri Western State University in March 2019.

References

External links 
Temple University, Japan bio

Living people
Florida lawyers
University of Utah alumni
Temple University alumni
University of Wyoming faculty
University of Akron faculty
Presidents of the University of Akron
Presidents of Missouri Western State University
American expatriates in Japan
Year of birth missing (living people)